Little Egypt may refer to:

Little Egypt (archaeological site), Mississippian culture site located in Murray County, Georgia
Little Egypt (dancer), stage name of three belly dancers
A nickname for Southern Illinois
A neighborhood in Astoria, Queens, New York City
Little Egypt, Texas, in Dallas County
Little Egypt, novel by Lesley Glaister
Little Egypt (film), 1951 American film starring Rhonda Fleming
"Little Egypt (Ying-Yang)", 1961 song written by Jerry Leiber and Mike Stoller
Little Egypt, a wrestler in the Gorgeous Ladies of Wrestling series